A variety of factors affect the water and coastline of Lebanon, including marine pollution and the environmental impact of shipping. The impacts include oil spills, noxious liquid substances spills, sewage spills, and the dumping of radioactive and medical waste.

Oil spills

Jiyeh Power Station Bombing

The Jiyeh power station oil spill is an environmental disaster that happened during the 2006 Lebanon war and is compared to the scale of the Exxon Valdez spill. Lebanese people claimed their suffering from this disaster (The slick increased the risk of cancer and other disease, killed fish and other marine resources...) and unlike the Deepwater Horizon 20,000,000,000 $ Trust, Lebanese people were not honored and did not receive any compensation. There have been long-term effects on Lebanese people from this oil spill.

Oil pollution from ships

According to an ITOPF study, 91% of the operational oil spills are small, resulting in less than 7 metric tons per spill. Lebanese public opinion and Lebanese authorities do not react to these minor spills occurring by the merchant ships calling the Lebanese ports. Being without inspection, and discharging close to the shore, oil Tankers are polluting  the coast of Amsheet, Beirut, Jieh, Tripoli, Zahrani and Zouk. These pollutions have a direct effect on the marine life in these regions. Also, big cargo ships coming to Lebanon transport the equivalent oil volume of small tankers, and are polluting essentially from their machinery space. See Marpol Annex I.

Ballast water discharge 

Ballast water discharge typically contains a variety of  biological materials, including plants, animals, viruses, and bacteria. These materials often include non-native, nuisance, exotic species that can cause extensive ecological and economic damage to aquatic ecosystems. Ballast water discharges are believed to be the leading source of invasive species in Lebanese marine waters, thus posing public health and environmental risks, as well as significant economic cost to industries such as commercial and recreational fisheries, agriculture, and tourism. Unlike developed countries, Lebanon do not have any regulations on the ballast water discharges. Ships calling Lebanese ports discharge stagnant ballast water (Without being exchanged in the middle of the sea), oily ballast water, graywater and bilge water without any control or sanctions by the Lebanese authorities.

Sewage spills
In many cases along the Lebanese coast, sewage coming from the Buildings on the coast, flow towards the Mediterranean without any treatment. Being without inspection, merchant navy vessels do not respect the Marpol 73/78 annex IV which controls pollution of the sea by sewage from ships.

Sea dumping

A serious issue to the Lebanese marine environment is the dumping of rubbish from lorries as wells as from ships.  There have been a number of cases, particularly involving Sukleen, dumping its waste (including radioactive waste and hazardous medical waste) in the vicinity of the Karantina region.   There are also many waste disposal locations on the Lebanese coast especially near Saida port, Bourj Hammoud, Normandie and Tripoli. In addition many cattle carriers dump their animal cadavers in the Lebanese territorial waters. See Marpol 73/78 annex V.

Noxious liquid substances spills
According to CNRS surveys, The Chekka sea area is polluted by Noxious chemical substances (Sulfuric acid, Phosphoric acid...). These Noxious liquid substances spills occur essentially during the Loading/discharging operations at the Sellaata chemical Terminal near Chekka.  See Marpol 73/78 annex II.

References

Environment of Lebanon